Nyapaṟi is an Aboriginal community in the Aṉangu Pitjantjatjara Yankunytjatjara Lands in South Australia.

There are about 50-100 people living there, including a small number of piranpa (non-Aboriginal) people. The residents are mostly Pitjantjatjara people. Nyapaṟi began as a family outstation by the Stevens family, who moved here to look after the country of their ancestors. Today it is a fully established community of extended families. It serves as an administration centre for nearby outstations Ulkiya and Tankannu.

Because both Nyapaṟi and nearby Kaṉpi are small communities, there are only basic services and most of them are shared between the two towns. In Nyapaṟi, there is an art centre and a health clinic. Supplies are delivered once every two weeks, and mail is delivered once per week. The community store is in Kaṉpi.

Both Kaṉpi and Nyapaṟi had their own schools from 1987, but these merged in 1993.

The Tjungu Palya art centre at Nyapari supports the development of a number of artists, some of whom have had work exhibited in Darwin, Singapore, Alice Springs, Melbourne and Switzerland, as well as in Tarnanthi at the Art Gallery of South Australia in Adelaide in 2017. The centre is one of ten Indigenous-owned and -governed enterprises that go to make up the APY Art Centre Collective, established in 2013.

References

Towns in South Australia
Aboriginal communities in South Australia
1970s establishments in Australia
Anangu Pitjantjatjara Yankunytjatjara